The men's marathon event at the 1995 Summer Universiade was held on 3 September in Fukuoka, Japan.

Results

References

Athletics at the 1995 Summer Universiade
1995